Noh Hong-chul (born 31 March 1979) is a South Korean entertainer and entrepreneur. He is the co-host of the variety show Talents for Sale. He previously appeared on the television programs Infinite Challenge and I Live Alone. He had a cameo in the popular music video "Gangnam Style" which featured his trademark pelvic thrusting .

Career

Pre-debut
Noh Hong-chul studied mechanical engineering at the Hongik University. After finishing his mandatory two-year military service, he created the online fashion malls Nohongchul.com and Dream and Adventurous Hongchul-Land Corporation which sell a range of party supplies. Noh Hong-chul also ran Hongchul Tour which provided budget trip services in China; he sometimes personally guided his customers during these trips.

2004–present
Noh Hong-chul's television debut came on Mnet in early 2004 when he hosted the cable TV show Dr. No's Pleasure Street. After the success of the show, he joined the free-to-air MBC program Come to Play as a joint panelist. In April 2005, he became a founding member of variety show Infinite Challenge.

He was featured in a commercial for the GM Daewoo Matiz. The ad showed caricatures and photos of him inserted into the hood (bonnet) and doors of his red Matiz car (nicknamed  , a play on his name and the word hong which means red).

Noh Hong-chul had a brief cameo in Psy's music video "Gangnam Style". He was shown thrusting his pelvis in his trademark lewd dance or  while standing above Psy rapping in an elevator. His seven-second appearance in the video became a worldwide "sensation within a sensation" and he was, separately from Psy, invited to appear on US television.

He made an appearance in Psy's video "Gentleman" alongside the rest of the Infinite Challenge members; and in Sistar's music video, "Touch My Body" alongside Jung Jun-mo.

Personal life

Drunk driving incident
On November 8, 2014, Noh Hong-chul was arrested for drunk driving. He later issued an apology and withdrew from the television programs he was participating in, including Infinite Challenge and I Live Alone.

Filmography

Current programs

Web shows

Former programs

 Mnet "KIN streets of Dr. No" – VJ
 Mnet "Super Vibe Party" – fixed cast
 MBC Rainbow Romance
 MBC Sunday Sunday Night – fixed panel
 MBC "Best Saturday" – fixed panel
 MBC "Sunday Phone Get Star Wars" – co-MC
 KBS "1 lesson Republic of Korea" – fixed panel
 MBC "Mysterious TV Surprise" – co-MC
 Mnet "Campus Corner Dance" – co-MC
 MBC 7 Octaves – fixed panel
 KBS Happy Sunday – "Kwaenam Age" – fixed panel
 KBS Happy Sunday – "Power attendance! Let's go to school" – co-MC
 KBS Happy Sunday – "I'm ready." – co-MC
 KBS Happy Sunday – "1 Night 2 Days" – co-MC
 SBS Good Sunday – "Change" – co-MC
 SBS "it! No?" – co-MC
 MBC "Yoo Jae-seok & Kim Won-Hee's Come to Play" – fixed panel
 Mnet "Phil Trend Report Season 4" – MC
 SBS Good Sunday – "Gold Miss is Coming" – co-MC
 KBS "Imaginary Confrontation" – co-MC
 MBC "Fox's Butler" – fixed panel
 KBS Escape Crisis No. 1 – co-MC
 SBS Good Sunday – "Hero hogeol" – co-MC
 tvN Korea's Got Talent – co-MC
 tvN Becoming a Billionaire – co-MC
 mbn "Star byte" – MC
 M.net "Serenade Battle" – MC
 OnStyle "Hello! Russia" – story
 Korean TV "Choehyeonwoo, Magic Hall of GNP" – co-MC
 MBC "God of the Game" – co-MC
 MBC I'm a Singer – Season 2 – co-MC
 tvN "Find the Fake? A keen eye" – co-MC
 KBS "Talk show, slapping" – co-MC
 KBS W "All That's GNP living" – MC
 MBC "MBC Special Documentary – Seoul to Savor" – story
 tvN The Genius: Rule Breaker
 KBS "Yihyeokjae, riding in the GNP" – co-MC
 MBC "Thank you" – co-MC
 MBC "The Lord of the study" – co-MC
 MBC "Sweet Girl" MC
 MBC "Hidden operation stage winner" – co-MC
 MBC "When I was the man to be alone" – MC
 MBC "Folks in my soul" – co-MC
 KBS " I am the man" – co-MC
 MBC "Love Notice" – co-MC
 MBC Infinite Challenge – co-host, founding member, (2005–2014)
 tvN Of the Birth Rich Person – co-host
 M.net Serenade Operations – co-host
 MBC Come to play''' – joint panel (2004–2010)
 MBC 7 Octaves – joint panel
 MBC The lord of Study (special coverage for 2007 Hangawi holidays) – co-host
 KBS 2TV Happy Sunday – 2 Days & 1 Night – joint panel
 SBS Power FM's Noh Hong-cheol's Happy Our Young Day – host (May 1 – November 6, 2006)
 SBS Gold-miss is coming – host-in-chief
 M.net Trend Report Fil (latest fashion trend magazine) – host
 SBS Heroes – host
 KBS 2TV Emergency Escape Number One! – co-host
 tvN Korea's Got Talent – co-host
 KBS 2TV Do Dream – co-host
 MBC I Live Alone – host-in-chief (episodes 1–79)
 MBC Show! Music Core – co-host (April 2013 – June 28, 2014)
 KBS 2TV Talents for Sale – co-host (May 6 – October 7, 2016)
 JTBC Mix Nine – host (October 29, 2017January 26, 2018)
 MBC  - co-host (December 7, 2018 – March 15, 2019)
 SBS Circle House'' - co-host (24 February – 28 April 2022)

Radio

Film

Awards

References

External links 
 Noh Hong-chul at FNC Entertainment
 Commercial Homepage  (online shopping mall which he created)

Infinite Challenge members
South Korean television presenters
South Korean radio presenters
South Korean comedians
1979 births
Living people
FNC Entertainment artists
Gyoha No clan